Modern Quarterly was a British Marxist journal founded in 1938 and was the first academic journal in Britain dedicated to Marxism.

It had an editorial council composed of:
 John Bernal
 Patrick Blackett
 V. Gordon Childe
 Wilfrid Le Gros Clark
 Benjamin Farrington
 J. B. S. Haldane
 Harold Laski
 Hyman Levy
 Peter Chalmers Mitchell
 Joseph Needham
 Roy Pascal
 Erich Roll
 Susan Stebbing
 George Thomson
 Barnet Woolf

From 1945-1953 the journal was edited by the Welsh Marxist philosopher John Lewis   It was continuously published until 1953 when it became the Marxist Quarterly. It was closely associated with the Communist Party of Great Britain.

References
Modern Quarterly Indexed at WorldCat. Accessed October 2014.

Defunct journals
Marxist magazines